The governor of Maryland is the head of government of the U.S. state of Maryland and is commander-in-chief of the state's military forces. The governor is the highest-ranking official in the state, and the constitutional powers of Maryland's governors make them among the most powerful governors in the United States.

The current governor is Democrat Wes Moore, who took office on January 18, 2023.

Governors 

Maryland was one of the original Thirteen Colonies and was admitted as a state on April 28, 1788. Before it declared its independence, Maryland was a colony of the Kingdom of Great Britain.

Under the constitution of 1776, governors were appointed by the General Assembly legislature to one-year terms and could be reelected for two additional terms, though they must take four years off after leaving office. An 1838 constitutional amendment allowed for popular election of governors to three-year terms, though they could not succeed themselves. The 1851 constitution removed the term limit, and lengthened terms to four years, to commence on the second Wednesday of the January following the election. Governors were limited to two consecutive terms beginning in 1948.

The office of lieutenant governor was created in 1864, abolished in 1867, and recreated in 1970. The lieutenant governor succeeds to the office of governor should it become vacant. In the original constitution, the first named of the Governor's Council would act as governor if it were vacant, until a new governor were selected; this was changed to the secretary of state in 1837. The 1867 constitution originally called for the General Assembly to immediately elect a new governor; if they were not in session, the president of the Senate would act as governor until one was elected.

Notes

See also
Gubernatorial lines of succession in the United States#Maryland

References 
 General

 
 
 

Specific

External links

Office of the Governor of Maryland

Lists of state governors of the United States

Governors